Hues is a live album by American jazz saxophonist Sam Rivers featuring performances recorded between 1971 and 1973 and released on the Impulse! label.

Reception
The Allmusic review by Andrew Hamilton awarded the album 4 stars stating "Hues is thoroughly enjoyable and should be reissued".

Track listing 
All compositions by Sam Rivers
 "Amber" - 4:26
 "Turquoise" - 4:01
 "Rose" - 5:13
 "Chartreuse" - 3:17
 "Mauve" - 4:17
 "Indigo" - 1:28
 "Onyx" - 4:04
 "Topaz" - 4:02
 "Ivory Black" - 4:13
 "Violet" - 5:48
Recorded at The Jazz Workshop in Boston, Massachusetts on February 13 (tracks 1-3) & 14 (track 4), 1971 at Oakland University in Rochester, Michigan on October 27, 1972 (tracks 5 & 6), at the Molde Jazz Festival in Molde, Norway on August 3, 1973 (tracks 7 & 8), and at Battell Chapel, Yale University in New Haven, Connecticut on November 10, 1973 (track 9 & 10)

Personnel 
 Sam Rivers - soprano saxophone, tenor saxophone, flute, piano
Arild Andersen (track 7 & 8), Richard Davis (tracks 5 & 6), Cecil McBee (track 1-4, 9 & 10)  - bass
Barry Altschul (tracks 7-10), Norman Connors (tracks 1-4), Warren Smith (tracks 5 & 6) - drums, percussion

References 

Impulse! Records live albums
Sam Rivers (jazz musician) albums
1974 live albums